Arthur Henry Southcote Aston (4 July 1875 – 30 May 1949) was an English first-class cricketer, barrister and judge in British India.

The son of H. F. Aston, he was born in British India at Poona in July 1875. He was educated in England at Harrow School, before going up to Balliol College, Oxford. After graduating from Oxford, he was called to the bar in 1901 to practice as a barrister. The following year he departed for British India, where he practiced as a barrister at Bombay. He was the honorary secretary of the Bombay Gymkhana in 1904 and 1905, which was the venue for his only appearance in first-class cricket for the Europeans cricket team against the Parsees in the 1904–05 Bombay Presidency Match. He spent a year in Sind as a public prosecutor and government pleader, before returning to Bombay in 1907 to take up the appointment of Chief Magistrate and Revenue Judge. Returning to England, Aston died at Winchester in May 1949. He had married in 1906 Ada Lilian Savile, with the couple having a son and a daughter.

References

External links

1875 births
1949 deaths
People from Pune
People educated at Harrow School
Alumni of Balliol College, Oxford
English barristers
British people in colonial India
English cricketers
Europeans cricketers
Judges of the Bombay High Court
Judges in British India